Events from the year 1699 in France.

Incumbents 
Monarch: Louis XIV

Events
 20 January: Louis XIV gave the French Academy of Sciences its first rules.
 11 June: France, England and the Dutch Republic agree on the terms of the Treaty of London (1700) (Second Partition Treaty) for Spain.
 The Académie Royale de Peinture et de Sculpture holds the first of a series of salons at the Louvre Palace.

Births
 26 March: Hubert-François Gravelot, illustrator (d. 1773)
 26 June: Marie Thérèse Rodet Geoffrin, salonnière (d. 1777)
 17 August: Bernard de Jussieu, naturalist (d. 1777)
 25 August: Charles Étienne Louis Camus, mathematician and mechanician (d. 1768)
 13 October: Jeanne Quinault, actress and playwright (d. 1783)
 2 November: Jean-Baptiste-Siméon Chardin, painter (d. 1779) 
 25 November: Pierre Subleyras, painter (d. 1749)
 Undated: Joseph Galien, professor of philosophy and theology at the University of Avignon, meteorologist, physicist and writer on aeronautics (d. 1762 or 1782)

Deaths
 20 February: Jean-Baptiste Monnoyer, painter (b. 1636)
 21 April: Jean Racine, classic dramatist (b. 1639)
 26 September: Simon Arnauld, Marquis de Pomponne, diplomat and minister (b. 1618)
 18 November: Pierre Pomet, pharmacist (b. 1658)
 30 December: Pierre Robert, composer (b. c. 1618)
 Undated: Antoine Le Grand, Cartesian philosopher, in England (b. 1629)

See also

References

1690s in France